The Nicholls Colonels baseball team is a varsity intercollegiate athletic team of Nicholls State University in Thibodaux, Louisiana. The team is a member of the Southland Conference, which is part of the National Collegiate Athletic Association's Division I. Nicholls State's first baseball team was fielded in 1960. The team plays its home games at 2,100-seat Ben Meyer Diamond at Ray E. Didier Field and is coached by Mike Silva.

Championships

Conference championships 
Regular Season 
Gulf South: 1974, 1976 
Gulf Star: 1985

Tournament 
Trans America Athletic: 1984
Southland: 1998

History

NCAA tournament appearances
 NCAA Division I Baseball Tournament: 1989, 1992, 1998
 NCAA Division II Baseball Tournament: 1970, 1972, 1974, 1976, 1977

Conference affiliations

Source:

Stadiums

Ben Meyer Diamond at Ray E. Didier Field

Ben Meyer Diamond at Ray E. Didier Field is a baseball stadium in Thibodaux, Louisiana. It is the 2,100-seat home stadium of the Nicholls Colonels college baseball team. The stadium which opened in 1960 is named for Raymond "Ray" Didier, a former Nicholls head baseball coach and athletic director. The diamond is named for Ben Meyer.

Head coaches

Source:

See also
 List of NCAA Division I baseball programs
 Nicholls Colonels

References

External links
 

 
Baseball teams established in 1960
1960 establishments in Louisiana